Yihui Xie is a Chinese statistician, data scientist and software engineer for RStudio. He is the principal author of the open-source software package Knitr for data analysis in the R programming language, and has also written the book Dynamic Documents with R and knitr.

Early life and education 
Yihui Xie graduated from Renmin University of China with a bachelor's degree in Economics and master's degree in Statistics. He earned his Ph.D from Iowa State University supervised by Di Cook and Heike Hofmann.

Career and research 
Yihui Xie created the animation package in R which allows animation in graphics through R. He then authored the knitr package which makes reproducible research available from R. Since 2013, he has been working with RStudio, the makers of an Integrated development environment (IDE) for the R programming language.

Awards and honors
Xie was awarded the John M. Chambers statistical software award by American Statistical Association (ASA) in 2009 for the R package animation.

Publications 
His publications include:
 R Markdown Cookbook
 R Markdown: The Definitive Guide
 blogdown: Creating Websites with R Markdown
 bookdown: Authoring Books and Technical Documents with R Markdown
 Dynamic Documents with R and knitr
 animation: An R Package for Creating Animations and Demonstrating Statistical Methods

References 

Iowa State University alumni
Renmin University of China alumni
Living people
Year of birth missing (living people)
Place of birth missing (living people)
Chinese statisticians
Data scientists
R (programming language) people